Robert Clyde Jones (born December 18, 1951) is an American former professional basketball player who played for the Denver Nuggets in the American Basketball Association (ABA) and the Philadelphia 76ers in the National Basketball Association (NBA). Nicknamed "the Secretary of Defense", Jones won an NBA championship with the 76ers in 1983, was a four-time NBA All-Star, an eight-time member of the NBA All-Defensive Team, and was the NBA Sixth Man of the Year in 1983.

Biography
Bobby Jones was one of the most admired defenders ever to wear an NBA uniform. While most other players depended on the occasional thrown elbow, hip-check, or grab of the uniform to gain an advantage, Jones relied on hustle and determination. It was Jones’ stellar defense along with his other specialties such as leadership, that made him a standout sixth man. Opposing teams could ill afford to relax on defense when Jones came off the bench, and they also had to work a lot harder on offense to get the ball in or even near the basket.

Jones's coaches would marvel that he was so good at things they had trouble getting many other players to do at all, such as blocking shots, moving without the ball, hustling back on defense, tipping passes, diving after loose balls, and giving up an open outside shot so a teammate could hit from inside—all things that rarely show up in a box score. 

What that work added up to was a 12-year pro career that featured eight selections to the NBA All-Defensive First Team; the first-ever NBA Sixth Man Award; membership on the ABA All-Rookie Team; four appearances in the NBA All-Star Game and one in the ABA All-Star Game; and perhaps most prized, an NBA Championship with the Philadelphia 76ers in 1983. Above all, Jones's value as a player was evidenced by the fact that his teams never missed the playoffs.

"If I was going to ask a youngster to model after someone, I would pick Bobby Jones." Said longtime 76ers teammate Julius Erving, "He's a player who's totally selfless, who runs like a deer, jumps like a gazelle, plays with his head and heart each night, and then walks away from the court as if nothing happened."

As for his almost polite approach to the game, Jones believed that anything less would have been downright unacceptable. "If I have to play defense by holding on, that's when I quit," Jones said early in his career. "If I have to use an elbow to get position, then I’m going to have to settle for another position. And if I foul, or if the official makes a mistake, there's no use screaming about it. It won’t change things or make me happier."

On one of the few occasions Jones did address a referee, it was to point out that the official had called a foul on the wrong player: it was Jones, not a teammate, who was the guilty party. The trusting ref changed his call and assigned the foul to Jones—his fifth of the game. Larry Brown, Jones's coach with the Denver Nuggets, remarked, "Watching Bobby Jones on the basketball court is like watching an honest man in a liars’ poker game."

As for vices such as drinking, smoking, and cursing, they were out of the question. When a computer-generated ranking sponsored by Seagram Distillers rated Jones the NBA's "most consistent and productive player" in 1976–77, Jones turned over the $10,000 prize to religious charities. At the award dinner (held without alcohol at Jones's request) he pronounced from the podium: "I’m definitely against whiskey, and I just felt God gave me this money not to keep, but to use." And while he never asked teammates or coaches to avoid expletives, they frequently found themselves crying out "Oh, shoot!" in his presence.

Nothing seemed to disturb Jones on the court; the final buzzer meant the end of just another day on the job. "He has a rare ability to divorce himself from the games after they end," Dean Smith, Jones's coach at North Carolina, told the Philadelphia Daily News in 1984. "He is a man at peace with himself. It's what I term internal affirmation—and in Bobby, it's strong."

Jones suffers from asthma, as well as occasional epileptic seizures, and a chronic heart disorder, each of which require medication. Stricken by a seizure in his kitchen one day, Jones fell onto a butcher block and gashed open his head. The incident nearly led him to quit basketball for the clergy. His perseverance earned him Philadelphia's Most Courageous Athlete Award in 1983.

Strangely, Jones was never in love with the sport of basketball. As a kid growing up in North Carolina, he essentially had to play. His father had played on the Oklahoma Sooners national championship runner-up team of 1949, and older brother Kirby was an All-State cager and later a  Sooner as well. Since Kirby versus Mr. Jones did not make for many close matches, Bobby was invariably enlisted to join them in their games behind the house. "I didn’t enjoy sports," Jones remembered. "I would rather watch television, but my father wanted me to play."

As a sophomore at South Mecklenburg High School in Charlotte, the 6-foot-6 Jones made the basketball team. His brother Kirby was also on the squad. Bobby actually liked track and field better, because he could practice by himself and on his own terms. Twice he won the state high jump title, finishing second in his junior year to Bob McAdoo. As a senior, Jones broke the state record by clearing the bar at a height of 6 feet, 8 inches.

Jones blossomed on the court in his junior year, earning Charlotte's Player of the Year Award and leading South Mecklenburg into the state playoffs. His squad lost to a Greensboro team that starred McAdoo, but South Mecklenburg won the championship a year later. Still, with all of his success as a cager, Jones did not think much about a future in basketball. "It was a seasonal thing," he said, "but the colleges became interested, so I thought it was a way I could go to school free." Jones ended up playing for Dean Smith at the University of North Carolina.

Jones had a splendid year as a college sophomore, then doctors discovered that he had an irregular heartbeat. Their prescription: a few weeks’ rest. (Jones later had to take medication before every game to control the problem.)

At around the same time, tryouts for the 1972 U.S. Olympic Team were about to be held. Jones was not only unaware of the trials, but he also did not know that the Games were being staged in Munich. When Smith heard that a couple of players had been taken ill at the tryouts, he got on the phone and got Jones a shot. Jones made the team but had little time on the court, playing only 5 minutes in the Soviet Union's infamous win over the United States in the gold medal game.

The American Basketball Association's Carolina Cougars selected Jones after his junior season in the 1973 Special Circumstances Draft, but Jones wanted to finish his psychology degree and polish his game, so he returned to North Carolina for his senior year. He turned in an All-America campaign in 1973–74, averaging 16.1 points, and was selected by the Houston Rockets with the fifth overall pick in the 1974 NBA draft.

Meanwhile, the Cougars franchise was moved to Missouri after the 1973–74 season and became the Spirits of St. Louis. Former Carolina Coach Larry Brown had moved on to the Denver Nuggets, and he was hell-bent on getting his hands on Jones. After acquiring his rights from St. Louis in exchange for the rights to Marvin Barnes, the Nuggets outbid Houston for Jones's services, offering him a seven-year, $1.4-million contract.

With Brown at the reins and Jones in the frontcourt, Denver went 65–19 in 1974–75, the best record in the ABA that year and the second-best mark in league history. Jones shot .604 from the floor for an ABA record, scored 14.8 points per game, and won a spot on the ABA All-Rookie Team. In 1975–76, the ABA's final season, Jones averaged 14.9 points and 9.5 rebounds and again topped the circuit in field-goal percentage at .581. He also played in the 1976 ABA All-Star Game and was named to the All-ABA Second Team. The Nuggets, with stars David Thompson and Dan Issel, finished with a league-best 60–24 record.

Jones made a graceful transition to the NBA with the ABA–NBA merger in June 1976, as did the rest of the Nuggets. Denver shocked the more established circuit by winning the Midwest Division that season and the next year as well. Thompson was an offensive machine, and Jones made solid contributions at both ends of the floor. In 1976–77 he averaged a career-high 15.1 points, ranked third in the league with a .570 field-goal percentage, and played in his first NBA All-Star Game. He also outpolled all other players in earning the first of eight straight selections to the NBA All-Defensive First Team. The following season Jones averaged 14.5 points, elevated his field-goal percentage to a league-leading .578, and returned to the All-Star Game.

Nuggets management, however, feared Jones would be limited by his health problems. After the 1977–78 campaign he was traded to the Philadelphia 76ers with Ralph Simpson for forward George McGinnis. McGinnis lasted a year and a half in Denver; Jones went on to play eight seasons in Philadelphia.

Primarily a starter during his four seasons with the Nuggets, Jones was forced to make yet another transition after his first year with the Sixers. Coach Billy Cunningham thought Jones would be best utilized as a sixth man, coming off the bench for frontcourtmen Julius Erving, Darryl Dawkins, and Caldwell Jones. Cunningham was worried that the change would devastate Jones, but it took Jones about half a minute to agree to the coach's plan.

During his first two seasons coming off the bench, beginning with the 1979–80 campaign, Jones still averaged about 25 minutes and 13 to 14 points, shooting at least .530 from the floor each year. He returned to the NBA All-Star Game in both 1981 and 1982 and was an All-Defensive First Team selection each year. In 1981–82, Bobby Jones briefly returned to the starting lineup for that season, starting 73 games.

With their system working to near perfection, the 76ers went to the Finals twice during the period, losing to the Los Angeles Lakers in both 1980 and 1982. The arrival of workhorse center Moses Malone from Houston prior to the 1982–83 campaign proved to be the final piece of the championship puzzle. In the regular season Malone repeated as league MVP, and Jones won the first-ever NBA Sixth Man Award. Philadelphia then romped through the playoffs, eventually sweeping the Lakers in the 1983 NBA Finals. In game one of the conference finals, the Milwaukee Bucks led by 109–108 with one minute 36 seconds to go. Alton Lister of the Bucks tried to inbound the ball but Jones stole the pass and flipped the ball to Clint Richardson. Richardson scored on a dunk to send the 76ers ahead 110–109. A Philadelphia Inquirer article on Jones paraphrased the famous John Havlicek call by Johnny Most stating, "Bobby Jones stole the ball. It was grand larceny. Bobby Jones stole the ball and robbed the Milwaukee Bucks of a game, turning an almost-sure upset into a 111-109 overtime victory for the 76ers."

The Sixers began a steady decline after that championship year, finishing second to Boston the next three seasons. Jones turned in steady defense and solid numbers during those years, although his playing time and production tailed off gradually. Still, he was as efficient as ever. In his last season, 1985–86, Jones shot .559 from the floor. He retired at age 34, and the Sixers retired his uniform No. 24 shortly afterward.

Jones left the NBA as one of the most admired players of the era, if not of all time. Said a young Charles Barkley while a teammate of Jones's, "If everyone in the world was like Bobby Jones, the world wouldn’t have any problems."

Post-NBA career

In 2003, Jones cofounded a Charlotte, North Carolina-based religiously affiliated non-profit, 2xsalt, that supports underprivileged youth through sports, along with Bart Kofoed and former teammate and Hall of Famer David Thompson.

Bobby Jones has coached several school basketball teams in the Charlotte area including Charlotte Christian, Carmel Christian School, and the South Charlotte Thunder.

During his entire tenure with the Sixers, Jones' jersey always included the letter B with a period before his last name (B. JONES) above his number 24; he still wore it even after former teammate Caldwell Jones was traded for Moses Malone in 1982 and Caldwell's brother Charles left after only one season with the Sixers (1983–84). However, during the 2008 season, as part of the Sixers' 25th anniversary of the 1983 champions, he was given a framed replica jersey that simply states his last name without the letter B, since he was the only Sixer named Jones to play on the 1983 team.

On April 6, 2019, Jones was elected to the Naismith Memorial Basketball Hall of Fame.

On January 28, 2020 Joel Embiid requested and was granted permission by Jones to wear his retired jersey number 24 for the Sixers, in honor of the late Kobe Bryant.

See also
 Basketball at the 1972 Summer Olympics

References

External links
 
 

1951 births
Living people
All-American college men's basketball players
American men's basketball players
Basketball players at the 1972 Summer Olympics
Basketball players from Charlotte, North Carolina
Denver Nuggets players
Houston Rockets draft picks
Medalists at the 1972 Summer Olympics
Naismith Memorial Basketball Hall of Fame inductees
National Basketball Association All-Stars
National Basketball Association players with retired numbers
North Carolina Tar Heels men's basketball players
Olympic silver medalists for the United States in basketball
Philadelphia 76ers players
Small forwards
United States men's national basketball team players